Phoebe Earle (1790-1863), known by her married names of Phoebe Dighton and Phoebe MacIntyre, was a painter working in England who was appointed Flower Painter in Ordinary to Queen Adelaide.

Life
Born 1 September 1790 and baptised on 3 October 1790 at St Marylebone Parish Church in London, she was the first child of the Massachusetts painter James Earl and Georgiana Caroline Pilkington (1757-1838), Irish daughter of John Carteret Pilkington. Her younger brother, also an artist, was Augustus Earle and her older half-brother was Admiral William Henry Smyth.

On 22 June 1812 at St Pancras Old Church in London she married the fellow-painter Denis Dighton and they had two sons, the first not living long while the second, Henry Denis Dighton (1817-1874), became an officer in the British Army. In 1820 her work was first accepted for the Royal Academy Summer Exhibition and she exhibited there for much of the rest of her life. The Royal Society of British Artists also showed her work from 1825 on and she was exhibited at the British Institution.

When her husband's mental health began to fail, she moved with him and their surviving son to Brittany, returning to England after his death in 1827. Settling in the spa town of Leamington, she built up a clientele as a teacher of drawing, painting and wax modelling, with her reputation became national in 1830 when she was given the court post of fruit and flower painter to the new Queen Adelaide. Living close to Stratford-upon-Avon, in 1835 she produced a book of hand-coloured lithographs called Relics of Shakespeare and her work was shown outside England at the Royal Scottish Academy in 1837. 

On the death in 1838 of her half-sister Elizabeth Smyth (1787-1838), wife of James Murray (1779-1847), who looked after the insane John Murray, 5th Duke of Atholl at his house in Kilburn, Phoebe took over the responsibility and sold her business in Leamington. On 7 February 1839, with her half-brother giving her away, at Christ Church, St Marylebone, she married Patrick MacIntyre, a senior executive of the United Kingdom Life Assurance Company, a predecessor company of Aviva, who moved in with her to care for the Duke.

After the Duke died in 1846, the two moved to Kensington and were able to take a long holiday in Europe. Last shown at the Royal Academy in 1854, she died in Edinburgh on 11 December 1863 during a visit to her nephew Charles Piazzi Smyth and his wife Jessie.

Books
Relics of Shakespeare, from drawings by Mrs. Denis Dighton, by appointment fruit and flower painter to Her Majesty the Queen. Stratford-upon-Avon, June, 1835.

References

1790 births
1863 deaths
19th-century English painters
19th-century English women artists
English women painters
Painters from London